Transmit is a file transfer client program for macOS. Developed by Panic, Transmit is shareware. After a seven-day trial period, the product can only be used for seven-minute sessions until it has been purchased. Originally built as an FTP client, it now supports a number of protocols ranging from the more traditional ones like SFTP and WebDAV to cloud services like Google Drive and Dropbox.

Transmit 4 includes a number of features, many of which take advantage of technologies Apple introduced in OS X 10.4, such as uploading using a Dashboard widget or the dock, support for .Mac and iDisk/WebDAV, FTP/WebDAV/S3 servers as disks in Finder (since v4.0), Spotlight, Droplets, Amazon S3 support and Automator plugins.

The app was called "Transit" at introduction in 1998, but had to be changed due to a conflict with an existing product. Transmit was originally developed for Classic Mac OS, but that version has been discontinued and made freeware.

Transmit for iOS was released in 2014 but removed and retired from the Apple app store in 2018.

History 

On February 16, 2005, Transmit 3 was released. The app was previewed to attendees of Macworld Expo the month prior in January 2005.

On April 27, 2010, Transmit 4 was released. More than five years after the release of version 3.0. The app was almost completely rewritten, had a brand new interface, over 45 new features, and was up to 25 times faster.

On June 10, 2016, Panic began beta testing Transmit 5, touting improved performance and new features. Transmit 5 was released the following year on July 18, 2017.

Awards 

Transmit is the recipient of a number of awards, including:
Apple Design Award, 2005 for "best Mac OS X Tiger technology adoption, for its use of features like Automator, Mac sync, Spotlight, Dashboard and more."
MacWorld Expo Best of Show (among 12 winners), 2005

See also 
Comparison of FTP client software

References 

Reviews

 Keith Martin, Transmit 3, MacUser issue 21 7, Apr 2005
 Joe Muscara, Transmit 2.1, MacUser issue 18 24, Nov 2002
 Rob Griffiths, Transmit 3 - Powerful file transfer app, macosxhints.com, Dec 28 2005, Pick of the Week

External links

FTP clients
SSH File Transfer Protocol clients
Macintosh-only software
MacOS-only software
Panic software